Gwen Moore (October 28, 1940 –  August 19, 2020) was an American politician who served as a member of the California State Assembly for the 49th district from 1978 to 1992 and the 47th district 1992 to 1994.

Early life and education 
Moore was born in Los Angeles, California. She earned a bachelor's degree and teaching credential from the University of California, Los Angeles.

Career 
In 1975, she was elected to the Los Angeles Community College District Board. She was elected to the California State Assembly in 1978 and served until 1994. During her tenure, Moore supported legislation related to supplier diversity and public access to restrooms in supermarkets larger than 20,000 square feet. She represented the 49th District; after the 1990 redistricting, the 49th was renumbered as the 47th district. With term limits impending, Moore decided to leave the Assembly with one term left and ran for Secretary of State of California in 1994. She lost the primary to Interim Secretary of State Tony Miller, who had succeeded to the office upon the resignation of March Fong Eu earlier in 1994.

Gwen Moore Lake in Kenneth Hahn State Recreation Area in the Baldwin Hills area of Los Angeles memorializes her public service.

Death 
On August 19, 2020, it was announced that Moore had died.

References

External links
 Join California Gwen Moore

1940 births
2020 deaths
2004 United States presidential electors
2008 United States presidential electors
20th-century American politicians
20th-century American women politicians
21st-century American politicians
21st-century American women politicians
African-American state legislators in California
African-American women in politics
Date of death missing
Democratic Party members of the California State Assembly
Place of death missing
Politicians from Los Angeles
Women state legislators in California
University of California, Los Angeles alumni
20th-century African-American women
20th-century African-American politicians
21st-century African-American women
21st-century African-American politicians